José "Pepe" Pla Mollà (born 25 January 1987 in Spain) is a Spanish retired footballer.

References

Association football defenders
Living people
1987 births
Spanish footballers
CF Gavà players
Huracán Valencia CF players